Blessthefall is an American metalcore band from Phoenix, Arizona, formed in 2004. They have released six studio albums, two extended plays, nineteen singles, and twenty-one music videos.

Studio albums

Extended plays

Singles

As featured artist

Music videos

References

Discographies of American artists